"Voices from the Other World" is a celebrated early poem by James Merrill (1926-1995). it marks the poet's first use of transcripts from a ouija board, a trope later explored at great length in the poet's apocalyptic epic "The Changing Light at Sandover" (1982).

The poem, written in the first person plural, consists of nine irregularly-rhymed five-line stanzas. The (unnamed) narrators of the poem are Merrill and his partner David Jackson, who together — after a Ouija board had been given to Merrill as a present by his friend Frederick Buechner in the early 1950s — would conduct hundreds of private séance sessions over the course of nearly four decades, an undertaking Merrill would come to mine extensively for "material." In this early spiritual encounter, the ouija board voices warn Merrill and Jackson of the perils of speaking with the dead, though by poem's end the two mediums have been lulled into a sense of nonchalance about the enterprise.

"Voices from the Other World" was first published in book form in The Country of a Thousand Years of Peace (1959).

External links 
 "Voices from the Other World", text of the poem (The Poetry Foundation)

American poems
Narrative poems
Poetry by James Merrill